John Boss may refer to:
 John B. Boss, American actor
 John Linscom Boss Jr. (1780–1819), U.S. Representative from Rhode Island